Events in the year 1971 in Turkey.

Parliament
 14th Parliament of Turkey

Incumbents
President – Cevdet Sunay
Prime Minister :
 Süleyman Demirel (up to 26 March 1971)
Nihat Erim (From 26 March 1971)
Leader of the opposition – İsmet İnönü (up to 26 March 1971)

Ruling party and the main opposition
Ruling party – Justice Party  (AP) (up to 26 March 1971)
Main opposition – Republican People's Party (CHP)  (up to 26 March 1971)

Cabinet

32nd government of Turkey (up to 26 March 1971)
33rd government of Turkey (26 March 1971 – 11 December 1971)
34th government of Turkey (from 11 December 1971)

Events
 20 January – Middle East Technical University closes following student unrest.
 21 March – CHP secretary general Bülent Ecevit resigns from his position because of İsmet İnönü’s support of the new government. 
 7 April – Nihat Erim forms a government.
 27 April – Martial law declared; student associations banned.
 13 May – Bingöl earthquake
 21 May – Constitutional Court closes down National Order Party for anti-secular propaganda.
 6 June – Galatasaray wins the Turkish championship.  
 20 July – Constitutional Court bans the Labor Party.
 19 September – Filiz Vural wins the Miss Europe.
 20 September – Parliament amends the constitution.
 6 October–17 October – Mediterranean Games take place in İzmir.
 12 October – U.S. vice president Spiro Agnew visits Ankara.
 18 October – Queen Elizabeth II visits Turkey.
 3 December – Vice Prime Minister Atilla Karaosmanoğlu and 10 other government ministers resign, ending the 33rd government.

Births
1 January – Emrah İpek (Emrah), singer
25 January – Elif Şafak, novelist
1 September – Hakan Şükür, former footballer and MP
7 November – Kazım Koyuncu, singer

Deaths
21 March – Falih Rıfkı Atay (aged 77), former journalist and politician 
14 July – Kılıç Ali (Ali Kılıç) (aged 81), former military officer and close friend of Atatürk
11 October – Hikmet Kıvılcımlı, leftist politician and writer

Gallery

See also
 1970–71 1.Lig
 List of Turkish films of 1971

References

 
Years of the 20th century in Turkey
1971 in Europe
1971 in Asia
Turkey